Disneyland Resort is a station on the Hong Kong MTR . It was built to serve the Hong Kong Disneyland Resort, and is located in Penny's Bay.

History 
It opened for public use on 1 August 2005, in preparation for the opening of Hong Kong Disneyland Resort, which opened on 12 September that year.

Station features 
The station is designed in a Victorian style, with spacious open areas. It has also been designed with a Disney theme in mind to match the décor of the park.

The platform is equipped with automatic platform gates to prevent passengers from accidentally falling onto the track. This kind of gate was the first of its kind to be introduced in Hong Kong. As of 2015, the current automatic platform gates are as long as a four-car train and can be extended in the future to accommodate a train length of up to eight cars. There is only one exit at this station.

There is a bus interchange at Hong Kong Disneyland Resort. R8 parallels the Disneyland Resort line. Routes R33 and R42 operate only on Sundays and public holidays.

Gallery

Station layout

See also

Rail transport in Walt Disney Parks and Resorts

References

Disneyland Resort line
Hong Kong Disneyland Resort
MTR stations in the New Territories
Penny's Bay
Railway stations in Hong Kong opened in 2005
Railways of amusement parks in Hong Kong
2005 establishments in Hong Kong